Minervarya kudremukhensis (common names: Kudremukh fejervarya, Kudremukh cricket frog) is a species of frogs in the family Dicroglossidae. It is endemic to the central Western Ghats of Karnataka state, India. The name kudremukhensis refers to the type locality, Kudremukh.

References

External links

kudremukhensis
Fauna of Karnataka
Endemic fauna of the Western Ghats
Frogs of India
Amphibians described in 2008